The Dean of Armagh in the Church of Ireland is the dean of the Anglican St Patrick's Cathedral, the cathedral of the Diocese of Armagh and the metropolitan cathedral of the Province of Armagh, located in the town of Armagh.

Shane Forster has been the dean since 2020.

Deans of Armagh

1206 Richard
1238 Mauritius
1256 Joseph
1262–1272 Henry de Ardagh
1272–1301 Brice
1301–1330 Dionysius (or Denis) 
1330–1334 David O'Hiraghty
1334–1362 Christopher O'Fearghila
1362 Patrick O'Kerry
1372 Maurice Dovey 
1397 Maurice O'Corry (deprived 1398) 
1398 John O'Goband
1406–1414 Thomas O'Luceran (deprived 1414) 
1425–1441 Denis O'Cullean
1443–1474 Charles O'Niellan
1475-1483 Thomas M'Camail (died 1483) 
1487–1492 Peter O'Mulmoy
1492–? Donald Macrivayr
1518–1549 Edmund M'Camail
1551 Terence Daniel (or Tirlagh O'Donnell) 
1590-1609 or 1610 Eugene Woods 
1610–1622 Robert Maxwell
1622 George Makeston (or Mackeson) 
1635 James Frey
1636/7 Peter Wentworth (returned to England 1641 and made Archdeacon of Carlisle, 1643) 
1643 William Sley 
1661 Francis Marsh (afterwards Bishop of Limerick, Ardfert and Aghadoe, 1667) 
1667–1681 James Downham
1681–1690 Bartholomew Vigors (afterwards Bishop of Ferns and Leighlin, 1690) 
1690/1–1722 Peter Drelincourt
1722–1731 Richard Daniel (afterwards Dean of Down, 1731) 
1731–1736 John Brandreth (afterwards Dean of Emly, 1736) 
1736–1753 James Auchmuty
1753–1764 Anthony Cope
1764–1768 Benjamin Barrington
1768–1796 Hugh Hamilton (afterwards Bishop of Clonfert and Kilmacduagh, 1796) 
1796–1830 Rt Hon James Hewitt
1830–1841 James Edward Jackson
1841–1851 Edward Gustavus Hudson
1851–1874 Brabazon William Disney
1875–1886 William Reeves (afterwards Bishop of Down, Connor and Dromore, 1886)
1886–1896 George Alexander Chadwick (afterwards Bishop of Derry and Raphoe, 1896)
1896 Augustine FitzGerald
1900 Robert James Shaw-Hamilton
1908 Francis George Le Poer McClintock
1924 Robert Smyly Greer Hamilton
1928–1938 Ford Tichborne (afterwards Bishop of Ossory, Ferns and Leighlin, 1938)
1938 Thomas James McEndoo
1955 Henry West Rennison
1965 Henry Alexander Lillie
1979 John Robert Megaw Crooks
1989 Herbert Cassidy
2006–2011 Patrick William Rooke (afterwards Bishop of Tuam, Killala and Achonry, 2011)
2011–2020 Gregory John Orchard Dunstan
2020–present Shane Forster

References

 
Diocese of Armagh (Church of Ireland)
Armagh